Boldizsár Kiss (born April 8, 1985) is a Hungarian former swimmer, who specialized in freestyle and butterfly events. He won a silver medal in the 200 m butterfly at the 2003 European Junior Swimming Championships in Glasgow, Scotland. Kiss is a member of the swimming team for Syracuse Orange, and a graduate of information management and technology at Syracuse University in New York.

Kiss qualified for the men's 400 m freestyle at the 2004 Summer Olympics in Athens, by eclipsing a FINA B-standard entry time of 3:57.86 from the national championships in Székesfehérvár. He challenged seven other swimmers on the third heat, where South Korea's Park Tae-Hwan was disqualified for a false start. He rounded out the field to last place by more than three seconds behind Brazil's Bruno Bonfim in 4:02.87. Kiss failed to advance into the final, as he placed thirty-eighth overall on the first day of preliminaries.

References

External links
Player Bio – Syracuse Orange

1985 births
Living people
Hungarian male swimmers
Olympic swimmers of Hungary
Swimmers at the 2004 Summer Olympics
Hungarian male freestyle swimmers
Male butterfly swimmers
Syracuse Orange men's swimmers
Swimmers from Budapest
20th-century Hungarian people
21st-century Hungarian people